The Mollweide projection is an equal-area, pseudocylindrical map projection generally used for maps of the world or celestial sphere. It is also known as the Babinet projection, homalographic projection, homolographic projection, and elliptical projection. The projection trades accuracy of angle and shape for accuracy of proportions in area, and as such is used where that property is needed, such as maps depicting global distributions.

The projection was first published by mathematician and astronomer Karl (or Carl) Brandan Mollweide (1774–1825) of Leipzig in 1805. It was reinvented and popularized in 1857 by Jacques Babinet, who gave it the name homalographic projection. The variation homolographic arose from frequent nineteenth-century usage in star atlases.

Properties
The Mollweide is a pseudocylindrical projection in which the equator is represented as a straight horizontal line perpendicular to a central meridian that is one-half the equator's length. The other parallels compress near the poles, while the other meridians are equally spaced at the equator. The meridians at 90 degrees east and west form a perfect circle, and the whole earth is depicted in a proportional 2:1 ellipse. The proportion of the area of the ellipse between any given parallel and the equator is the same as the proportion of the area on the globe between that parallel and the equator, but at the expense of shape distortion, which is significant at the perimeter of the ellipse, although not as severe as in the sinusoidal projection.

Shape distortion may be diminished by using an interrupted version. A sinusoidal interrupted Mollweide projection discards the central meridian in favor of alternating half-meridians which terminate at right angles to the equator. This has the effect of dividing the globe into lobes. In contrast, a parallel interrupted Mollweide projection uses multiple disjoint central meridians, giving the effect of multiple ellipses joined at the equator. More rarely, the projection can be drawn obliquely to shift the areas of distortion to the oceans, allowing the continents to remain truer to form.

The Mollweide, or its properties, has inspired the creation of several other projections, including the Goode's homolosine, van der Grinten and the Boggs eumorphic.

Mathematical formulation
The projection transforms from latitude and longitude to map coordinates x and y via the following equations:

where θ is an auxiliary angle defined by

and λ is the longitude, λ is the central meridian, φ is the latitude, and R is the radius of the globe to be projected. The map has area 4R, conforming to the surface area of the generating globe. The x-coordinate has a range of [−2R, 2R], and the y-coordinate has a range of [−R, R].

Equation (1) may be solved with rapid convergence (but slow near the poles) using Newton–Raphson iteration:

If φ = ±, then also θ = ±. In that case the iteration should be bypassed; otherwise, division by zero may result.

There exists a closed-form inverse transformation:

where θ can be found by the relation

The inverse transformations allow one to find the latitude and longitude corresponding to the map coordinates x and y.

See also

 List of map projections
 Aitoff projection
 Hammer projection
 Tobler hyperelliptical projection family

Notes

References

External links

An interactive Java applet to study deformations (area, distance and angle) of the Mollweide Map Projection
Mollweide Projection at Mathworld

Map projections
Equal-area projections